
Gmina Łanięta is a rural gmina (administrative district) in Kutno County, Łódź Voivodeship, in central Poland.

Villages
Gmina Łanięta contains the villages and settlements of Anielin, Bronisławów, Chrosno, Chruścinek, Franciszków, Juków, Kąty, Kliny, Klonowiec Wielki, Łanięta, Lipie, Marianów, Nowe Budy, Nutowo, Pomarzany, Rajmundów, Ryszardów, Stare Budy, Suchodębie, Suchodębie PGR, Świecinki, Świeciny, Wilkowia, Witoldów, Wola Chruścińska and Zgoda.

Neighbouring gminas
Gmina Łanięta is bordered by the gminas of Gostynin, Kutno, Lubień Kujawski, Nowe Ostrowy and Strzelce.

References
Polish official population figures 2006

Lanieta
Kutno County